William Manly King (May 19, 1886 – 1961) was an architect in the United States. He is known for the buildings he designed in Florida, especially West Palm Beach. Several are listed on the National Register of Historic Places.

King was born in Macon, Mississippi. His family moved to Atlanta and he attended University School for Boys in Stone Mountain, Georgia. He graduated from Georgia Tech with a degree in architecture in 1908.

Career
After a couple of partnerships in Birmingham, Alabama, King moved to Florida in 1921 and worked with Addison Mizner before establishing his own practice.

King's office was in West Palm Beach. He was the Palm Beach County Board of Public Instruction's architect and designed school buildings throughout Palm Beach County. He also designed hotels in West Palm Beach. He designed the seal for the City of West Palm Beach.

Work
Harder Hall in Highlands County, Florida, NRHP listed
Pahokee High School in Palm Beach County, Florida, NRHP listed
Old West Palm Beach National Guard Armory, at 1703 South Lake Avenue. Now the Armory Arts Center. Art Deco design. Works Progress Administration project built in 1939, NRHP listed
Osborne School (1948) in Lake Worth, Florida. A school for African American students. 1726 Douglas Street NRHP listed
Palm Beach Junior College (1927), 813 Gardenia Ave., opened in 1933 as Florida's first public community college. Mediterranean Revival in style.
Hibiscus Garden Apartments (1926)
West Palm Beach fire stations
Old Jupiter School
Boynton Beach High School (1927), 125 East Ocean Ave., Saved from wrecking ball as Boynton Beach Arts & Cultural Center 2021, cited by Art Deco Society of the Palm Beaches.

Referenced

1886 births
1961 deaths
Georgia Tech alumni
People from Macon, Mississippi
People from Stone Mountain, Georgia
Architects from Mississippi
Architects from Florida
Architects from Georgia (U.S. state)
Architects from Alabama
20th-century American architects